The brown locust (Locustana pardalina) is a medium-sized small locust species in the monotypic genus Locustana. It is found in Southern Africa and shows classic gregarious behaviour with phase polymorphism on crowding.

Biology

Control
Hopper band outbreaks are frequent in the Karoo and are controlled by farmers with insecticide spray operations: usually deltamethrin with motorised mistblowers set for ultra-low volume application (subsidised by the government).

Because of the environmental sensitivity of the Karoo biome and concerns about toxicity to grazing sheep, a biological pesticide product called 'Green Muscle', based on the entomopathogenic fungus (Metarhizium acridum), was tested by the LUBILOSA Programme in collaboration with the South African Plant Protection Institute: using novel application technique to compensate for the slow speed of kill.

References

Locusts
Orthoptera of Africa
Insects described in 1870
Agricultural pest insects
Monotypic Orthoptera genera